The 1994 Central and Western District Board election was held on 18 September 1994 to elect all 14 members to the Central and Western District Board, Hong Kong.

Overall election results
Before election:

Change in composition:

Results by constituency

Belcher

Castle Road

Chung Wan

Kennedy Town & Mount Davis

Kwun Lung

Middle Levels East

Peak

Sai Wan

Sai Ying Pun

Shek Tong Tsui

Sheung Wan

Tung Wah

University

Water Street

References

1994 Hong Kong local elections
Central and Western District Council elections